is a Japanese footballer who plays for Hokkaido Consadole Sapporo.

Career
He made his debut on 30 April 2011 against Tochigi SC, when he came off the bench to replace Atsutaka Nakamura. He scored his first goal with Kyoto against Ehime FC. However, his most important goal was scored against Yokohama F. Marinos in the semifinal of the 2011 Emperor's Cup when, after having started the match on the bench, he scored the last goal from Kyoto in the extra time, closing a 2-4 win against Yokohama which meant that Kyoto would play its first Cup Final since 2002 Emperor's Cup.

After five years and the captain armband obtained in Kyoto, Komai left in January 2016 to join Urawa Red Diamonds.

Career statistics

Club
Updated to 18 February 2019.

1Includes Promotion Playoffs to Division 1, J. League Championship, Japanese Super Cup, Suruga Bank Championship and FIFA Club World Cup.

References

External links

Profile at Consadole Sapporo
Profile at Urawa Reds

1992 births
Living people
Association football people from Kyoto Prefecture
Japanese footballers
J1 League players
J2 League players
Kyoto Sanga FC players
Urawa Red Diamonds players
Hokkaido Consadole Sapporo players
Association football wingers